Debris is rubble, wreckage, ruins, litter and discarded garbage/refuse/trash, scattered remains of something destroyed, etc.

Debris may also refer to:

 Road debris
 Glacial debris
 Ice rafted debris
 Marine debris
 Space debris
 Woody debris (disambiguation)
 Demolition waste
 Foreign object debris
 Behind-armor debris

Music
 Debris (Ayria album), 2003
 Debris (Sandwich album), 2015
 "Debris", a song by The Faces from A Nod Is As Good As a Wink... to a Blind Horse
 "Debris", a song by Linkin Park from LP Underground 12.0
 Debris Inc., doom metal/punk rock band from Chicago
 DJ Debris, a member of the Australian hip hop group Hilltop Hoods

Other uses
 Roger De Bris, a character in Mel Brooks' 1968 movie, The Producers
 Debris (play), a 2001 play by Dennis Kelley
 Debris (TV series), a 2021 American television series on NBC

See also